Adrastus of Aphrodisias (fl. 2nd century) was a Peripatetic philosopher who lived in the 2nd century AD.  He was the author of a treatise on the arrangement of Aristotle's writings and his system of philosophy, quoted by Simplicius, and by Achilles Tatius.  Some commentaries of his on the Timaeus of Plato are also quoted by Porphyry, and a treatise on the Categories of Aristotle by Galen. None of these have survived. He was a competent mathematician, whose writings on harmonics are frequently cited by Theon of Smyrna in the surviving sections of his On Mathematics Useful for the Understanding of Plato.  In the 17th century, a work by Adrastus on harmonics,  ("On Harmonics"), was said by Gerhard Johann Vossius to have been preserved, in manuscript, in the Vatican Library, although the manuscript appears to be no longer extant, if indeed this was not an error on Vossius' part.

Adrastus of Philippi is also reported by Stephanus of Byzantium, as a peripatetic philosopher, he is presumably the same philosopher, unless there was a different, earlier, disciple of Aristotle.

Notes

References

2nd-century philosophers
Commentators on Aristotle
Commentators on Plato
Roman-era Peripatetic philosophers
Ancient Greek music theorists
People from Aphrodisias